Jean Joseph "Black Cat" Gagnon (June 3, 1905 in Chicoutimi, Quebec – March 21, 1984) was a Canadian ice hockey forward.

Johnny played in the National Hockey League from 1930 to 1940. During this time, he played for the New York Americans, Boston Bruins, and Montreal Canadiens. He also played for the Providence Reds of the American Hockey League. He won the Stanley Cup in 1931 with the Montreal Canadiens. Gagnon was a modest sort who gave all the credit to his two superstar linemates, Howie Morenz and Aurel Joliat, claiming he'd simply pass them the puck, stand back, and get the assists.

After his retirement, he became a scout for the New York Rangers. He was in part responsible for the Rangers getting the great goaltender Eddie Giacomin, scouting him when he played for the American Hockey League's Providence Reds and becoming friends with Giacomin. He gave Rangers' general manager Emile Francis glowing reports on Giacomin, and finally Francis decided to see Giacomin play. Francis eventually obtained Giacomin for four players.

Gagnon died after a lengthy illness on March 21, 1984.

Career statistics

Regular season and playoffs

External links

1905 births
1984 deaths
Boston Bruins players
Canadian ice hockey forwards
Ice hockey people from Quebec
Montreal Canadiens players
New York Americans players
New York Rangers scouts
Providence Reds players
Quebec Castors players
Sportspeople from Saguenay, Quebec
Stanley Cup champions
Canadian expatriate ice hockey players in the United States